Patrice Marie Anderson (born November 22, 1959) is an American biathlete. She competed in the women's individual event at the 1992 Winter Olympics.

References

External links
 

1959 births
Living people
Biathletes at the 1992 Winter Olympics
American female biathletes
Olympic biathletes of the United States
Sportspeople from Duluth, Minnesota
21st-century American women